British Aerospace Company Ground was a cricket ground in Byfleet, Surrey.  The ground was built as a works venue for the nearby Vickers-Armstrongs factor at nearby Brooklands.  In 1920 a factory side was established, although the first recorded match on the ground was in 1970 when Surrey played Warwickshire in what was the ground's first List-A match.  From 1970 to 1979, the ground played host to 10 List-A matches, the last of which was between Surrey and Warwickshire in the 1979 John Player League.

The ground also hosted 7 Surrey Second XI matches in the Second XI Championship between 1970 and 1978.

1979 was to be the final year in which the ground was used, with the M25 motorway being constructed through it.

References

External links
British Aerospace Company Ground on CricketArchive
British Aerospace Company Ground on Cricinfo

Defunct cricket grounds in England
Cricket grounds in Surrey
Surrey County Cricket Club grounds
Woking
Defunct sports venues in Surrey